is the former governor of Miyagi, Japan, and currently university professor & political commentator.

Background

Early life and administrative career
Asano was born in the northern port town of Ofunato, Iwate, where his father was a town doctor. His father moved to nearby Tome, Miyagi and at age 4 to Sendai, the prefectural capital of Miyagi. He grew up there until finishing high school.

Asano graduated from the faculty of law of University of Tokyo in 1970 and joined the Ministry of Health and Welfare. From 1972 to 1974 he was an exchange student at the University of Illinois, Graduate School of Political Science. He returned to Japan until 1978, when he was stationed at the Japanese embassy in Washington D.C. as second and first secretary.  The position in Washington lasted until 1980.  Back in Japan he worked a number of posts in the Ministry of Health and Welfare and in 1993 he was posted to Miyagi Prefecture.

Political career
A few months after Asano arrived in Miyagi, the prefectural governor and the mayor of the city of Sendai were indicted in bribery charges that shocked the population. With little time to prepare he decided to run for the prefecture where he had grown up. He won, and his grass-roots approach to campaigning would carry him two more terms to the position of governor.

In 2005 he stepped aside and started a new career as an academic (now professor at Keio University and Tohoku University) and political TV commentator. Charismatic and good speaker he was encouraged to run for Tokyo governor in the 2007 Tokyo gubernatorial election. He faced Shintaro Ishihara, who run for his third four-year term, and several minor candidates. With barely a couple of months to prepare Asano ended up second on that election.

References

http://www.asanoshiro.org/profile/index.htm (Asano Shiro official profile, in Japanese)

External links
 Official Website 
 https://www.flickr.com/photos/hasekura/sets/72157600013119936/ (Flickr set on Asano Campaign)
 Asano Shiro / TV RANKING

1948 births
Governors of Miyagi Prefecture
Academic staff of Keio University
Living people
Politicians from Miyagi Prefecture
Tokyo gubernatorial candidates
University of Tokyo alumni
Academic staff of Tohoku University